Jackie (Jackline) Nake Lumbasi is a Kenyan media personality currently working in Kigali, Rwanda. She co-hosted The Big Breakfast Show on 91.3 Capital FM from 2008 to 2018 with a number of presenters including Gaetano Kagwa, Ramesh Gabalsing, Alan Kasujja, Marcus Kwikiriza and Oulanya  as well as read the evening news on UBC in Uganda until 2014.

Lumbasi went off Capital FM airwaves in February 2018 and joined an off air position at the same station after a full reshuffle of the Big Breakfast show but shortly after that moved to Rwandan-based Royal FM to do a morning Show in English Language alongside Kwizera.

She is very much known for her deep strong, husky voice hearty laugh and was mentioned among the highest paid radio presenters in Uganda.
She swears by her ability to tell stories and has written articles for different Newspapers in the region including The New Times, Rwanda. https://muckrack.com/jackie-lumbasi/articles
She is a voice over artiste, events host and moderator among other activities she engages in out of passion.

Career
Lumbasi started her media career as a presenter at a Christian radio station Power FM in Kampala. She then moved to Capital Fm Uganda where she started hosting the breakfast show in 2009 after the departure of Lilian Mbabazi until 2018 when the whole breakfast show was reshuffled. She revealed her departure in one of Flavia Tumusiime's video diaries which was shared on Flavia's and Capital FM's Facebook page. She immediately got an offer in Kigali, Rwanda in March 2018 where she hosted the breakfast show with Kwizera. Jackie joked about a fact that she has worked with people whose names start with letter K, citing Alan Kasujja, Marcus Kwikiriza, Gaetano Kagwa and currently in Rwanda, where she hosts a breakfast show dubbed 'Kigali In The Morning,' together with Kwizera_Arnold.
In 2019, Jackie Lumbasi was appointed Acting Station Manager of Royal Fm, a position in which she served until April 2022. 
On January 4th, 2023, through her Twitter account @JackieLumbasi,  she officially announced her departure from the radio, without divulging where she was headed. 
Through her time on air in Kigali, Rwanda Jackie worked with different Co-hosts including Babu and Chris.

Awards and nominations

References

External links

Kenyan radio presenters
Kenyan women radio presenters
1979 births
Living people
Kenyan journalists
Kenyan women journalists
Kenyan radio journalists
Kenyan women radio journalists
Kenyan television presenters
Kenyan women television presenters
Kenyan mass media people
Kenyan television journalists
Kenyan women television journalists